Tarapoa is located in the province of Sucumbíos in Ecuador and the seat of the canton of Cuyabeno.

It is served by Tarapoa Airport.

References 

Populated places in Sucumbíos Province